The High Life is a British situation comedy written by and starring Forbes Masson and Alan Cumming as Steve McCracken and Sebastian Flight. Cumming and Masson met at the Royal Scottish Academy of Music and Drama and united after several solo projects to create the theatrical BBC sitcom, The High Life. The two leads were based heavily on their famous Scottish comedy alter-egos, Victor and Barry.

The series followed the cabin crew at the fictional airline, Air Scotia, flying out of Prestwick Airport. The crew consisted of the camp, alcohol-loving, narcissistic and vindictive steward, Sebastian; his sex-obsessed colleague Steve; their up-tight, antagonistic chief stewardess, Shona Spurtle; and the eccentric pilot, Captain Hilary Duff.
Sebastian and Steve longed to be promoted to long-haul flights to see exotic locations, instead of the current short-haul trips with their superior Shona, played by Siobhan Redmond, whom they described as 'Hitler in tights', 'Mussolini in Micromesh' and 'Goebbels in a Gossard'. The deranged pilot, Captain Duff, played by Patrick Ryecart, would need to be frequently reminded who he was, where the cockpit was and where he was flying to.

The High Life was interspersed with surrealism, childish humour, sarcasm and theatrical song and dance numbers. It only ran for one series due to Cumming's increasingly successful film career in Hollywood; however during an interview, Masson claims that a second series was written, yet not acted upon. Despite its short run, it is remembered for Steve and Sebastian’s joint catchphrase: 'Oh dearie me!' and for the opening sequence which featured the cast performing a dance routine to the title song. During an interview on BBC television, Cumming noted that he accidentally mimed a Hitler-style salute during the opening sequence, due to being in the musical Cabaret at the time.

The series ran for six thirty-minute episodes. An initial pilot was broadcast in the Comic Asides anthology strand on BBC2 at 9pm on Sunday 9 January 1994. The series of six episodes were broadcast on Friday nights at 9.30pm between 6 January and 10 February 1995.

The entire series (including the pilot) was released on VHS and DVD in 2002, and was re-released in May 2009. The complete series was re-run on BBC Four early in 2009 and BBC Scotland in 2019.

Cast and crew
Alan Cumming - Sebastian Flight
Forbes Masson - Steve McCracken
Siobhan Redmond - Shona Spurtle
Patrick Ryecart - Captain Hilary Duff

Crew 
Alan Cumming - Writer
Forbes Masson - Writer
Tony Dow - Director (pilot)
Angela deChastelai Smith - Director (series)
Tony Dow - Producer

Episode guide
 Pilot  - "The High Life"
 Shona lands the job of presenting the Air Scotia’s in-flight video, much to Sebastian’s annoyance.
 Episode 1 - "Feart"
 Steve and Sebastian decide to find a way out of short-haul flights. The impending arrival of the staff inspector could make these dreams come true.
 Episode 2 - "Birl"
 Air Scotia employees attend a weekend of intensive training. Steve finds love with flight-attendant, Heather.
 Episode 3 - "Winch"
 Sebastian returns from his holiday in Florida to discover something has happened between Shona and Steve.
 Episode 4 - "Choob"
 An almost total reshoot of the Comic Asides pilot episode.
 Episode 5 - "Dug"
 Sebastian decides to enter the Song For Europe contest as Scotland’s first entry, in the hope of finding fame and fortune, and some girls for Steve. Meanwhile, the Air Scotia crew host a birthday for Aurora Borealis, the precocious daughter of Shona's favourite rock star.
 Episode 6 - "Dunk"
 The crew become involved in a small-business espionage plot involving biscuits, in a spoof of the 1960s series of Batman.

References

Scottish television shows
Scottish television sitcoms
1994 Scottish television series debuts
1995 Scottish television series endings
Aviation television series
Television shows set in Glasgow
1990s Scottish television series
Television shows set in Scotland
1990s British sitcoms
Television series about flight attendants